The Plantation Pipe Line Company, headquartered in Alpharetta, Georgia, delivers refined petroleum products to communities and businesses throughout the South and parts of the Eastern United States. The company is owned by a partnership between Exxon and the pipeline operator Kinder Morgan. Plantation consists of 3,100 miles of pipeline, originating at Baton Rouge, Louisiana, and terminating near Washington D.C. The pipeline travels through the coastal states of Louisiana, Mississippi, Alabama, Georgia, South Carolina, North Carolina, Virginia, and  Maryland. A branch from the main pipeline also reaches into Tennessee. Much of the pipeline route parallels the path of Colonial Pipeline and many terminals along the route can receive products from either pipeline. Major metropolitan markets served by Plantation include: Birmingham, Atlanta, Chattanooga, Knoxville, Greenville/Spartanburg, Charlotte, Greensboro, Roanoke, Richmond, and Washington.

History

1940

Several major oil companies began discussing a Gulf Coast-to-East Coast pipeline in 1940.

1942

Plantation began operation. Initial construction costs were $20,000,000.

1943

A 180 mile extension of Plantation was built from Greensboro to Richmond, Virginia.

1964

A 120 mile extension of Plantation was built from Richmond, Virginia to Alexandria, Virginia.

References

 
 
 
 

Refined oil product pipelines in the United States
Oil pipeline companies
Oil companies of the United States
Companies based in Fulton County, Georgia
Energy infrastructure in Georgia (U.S. state)
Energy infrastructure in North Carolina
Energy infrastructure in South Carolina
Energy infrastructure in Tennessee
Energy infrastructure in Virginia
ExxonMobil subsidiaries
Kinder Morgan
Oil pipelines in Louisiana
Pipelines in Mississippi
Pipelines in Alabama
Pipelines in Georgia (U.S. state)
Pipelines in South Carolina
Pipelines in Virginia
Pipelines in Maryland
Oil pipelines in Tennessee
Pipelines in North Carolina